Body of Water is a 2011 Finnish drama film directed by Joona Tena.

Cast 
 Krista Kosonen as Julia
 Kai Lehtinen as Leo
 Viljami Nojonen as Niko
 Peter Franzén as Elias
 Risto Aaltonen as Lantto
 Kari Hietalahti as Koskela
 Ilkka Villi as Julia's ex-husband

References

External links 

2011 drama films
2011 films
Finnish drama films
Films scored by Panu Aaltio
2010s Finnish-language films